Monte Plische is a mountain of the Veneto, Italy. It has an elevation of 1,991 metres.

Mountains of the Alps
Mountains of Veneto